Hari Nair is an Indian cinematographer known for his works in Malayalam cinema, Bengali cinema, English cinema, Hindi cinema. Hari graduated from the Film and Television Institute of India (FTII). He was born on 31st March 1965 at Ponnani.His father K.P. Rajgopalan Nair was the head of the department of Cinematography at the Film and Television Institute of India.

Career 
Hari, a member of the Indian Society of Cinematographers and graduated from the Film and Television Institute of India and went on to completing many features in different indian languages.

He was awarded the National Award for best Cinematographer for the film Sham’s Vision(Non Feature film), he received his first Kerala state award in Swaham (1994) and second for Ennu Swantham Janakikutty (1997).

Filmography

Films

Web series

Awards and nominations

References

External links 
 

Cinematographers from Kerala
Living people
People from Malappuram
Hindi film cinematographers
20th-century Indian photographers
21st-century Indian photographers
Year of birth missing (living people)
Malayalam film cinematographers